Justin Robert Carney (born 19 June 1988), also known by the nickname of "The Tank on the Flank", is an Australian former professional rugby league footballer who played on the  or as a . He played for Canberra Raiders and the Sydney Roosters in Australia, and Castleford Tigers (Heritage № 933), Salford Red Devils and Hull Kingston Rovers in the United Kingdom.

Career
Carney began his career with the Canberra Raiders, scoring two tries on his debut in a 34–16 win over the Brisbane Broncos in June 2008.
He suffered a broken leg during a match against Gold Coast in July 2009, which ruled him out for the rest of the 2009 season and all the 2010 season.
Carney was nominated for the 2009 Ken Stephen Medal, acknowledging his strong community work.

Carney joined Sydney Roosters in July 2010. He spent two seasons at the club, scoring three tries in 17 games.

Carney joined Castleford Tigers on a two-year contract from the 2013 season. Coach Ian Millward said of him, "Justin will become a crowd pleaser with his robust running and dynamic style. No one will run the ball harder or faster in the Super League in 2013." Carney scored 31 tries in 28 games for Castleford and, in 
April 2014, signed a new five-year deal up to the end of 2019.

He played in the 2014 Challenge Cup Final defeat by the Leeds Rhinos at Wembley Stadium.

However, he was suspended by Castleford in August 2015 and did not play again for the rest of the season. He had scored 63 tries in 62 games since joining Castleford in 2013.

Carney joined Salford Red Devils in November 2015 on a one-year loan deal, which was converted to a permanent three-year deal in April 2016. He received an eight-match ban in May 2017 after being found guilty of racial abuse and left Salford by mutual consent.
 
After leaving Salford, Carney joined Hull Kingston Rovers for the rest of the 2018 season. He retired at the end of the season and returned to Australia, where he joined Nyngan Tigers as captain-coach for 2019.

References

External links
Hull Kingston Rovers profile
Cas Tigers profile
SL profile

1988 births
Living people
Australian Aboriginal rugby league team players
Australian rugby league coaches
Australian rugby league players
Canberra Raiders players
Castleford Tigers players
Hull Kingston Rovers players
Indigenous Australian rugby league players
Newtown Jets NSW Cup players
Rugby league centres
Rugby league players from New South Wales
Rugby league wingers
Salford Red Devils players
Sydney Roosters players